We Will Become Like Birds is the fourth album by Erin McKeown. It was released via Nettwerk Records in 2005 and features contributions from Juana Molina and Peter Mulvey.

Track listing

 Aspera
 Air
 Life On the Moon
 To The Stars
 Beautiful (I Guess)
 Float
 We Are More
 White City
 The Golden Dream (with Juana Molina)
 Bells and Bombs
 Delicate December (with Peter Mulvey)
 You Were Right About Everything
 A Certain Pleasure (Bonus Track)

References

 

2005 albums
Erin McKeown albums